The BNSF Line is a Metra commuter rail line operated by the BNSF Railway in Chicago and its western suburbs, running from Chicago Union Station to Aurora, Illinois. In 2010, the BNSF Line continued to have the highest weekday ridership (average 64,600) of the 11 Metra lines. While Metra does not refer to its lines by particular colors, the BNSF line's color on Metra timetables is "Cascade Green," in honor of the Burlington Northern Railroad.

As of November 7, 2022, the public timetable shows 91 trains (44 inbound, 47 outbound) on the BNSF Line on weekdays. Weekend service consists of 30 trains (15 in each direction) on Saturdays, and 20 trains (10 in each direction) on Sundays, with all trains running the full route from Union Station to Aurora.

Bike cars are available on weekday trains #1212 (leaves 5:29 A.M.,) #1252 (leaves 9:04 A.M.,) and #1284 (leaves 5:04 P.M.) inbound from Aurora, and trains #1217 (leaves 7:33 A.M.,) #1239 (leaves 3:10 P.M.,) and #1283 (leaves 6:50 P.M.) outbound to Aurora.

Bike cars are available on weekend trains #2002 (leaves 6:20 A.M.) and #2012 (leaves 10:20 A.M.) inbound from Aurora, and trains #2003 (leaves 8:40 A.M.) and #2013 (leaves 2:40 P.M.) outbound to Aurora.

The line is operated by BNSF under a "purchase of service agreement" with Metra, inherited from Burlington Northern. While Metra owns all rolling stock, the management and crews are BNSF employees. BNSF controls the right-of-way on the line and handles dispatching from corporate headquarters in Fort Worth, Texas. Metra imposes a 70 mph maximum allowed speed for passenger trains.

History
The railroad between Chicago and Aurora was constructed in 1864 by the Chicago and Aurora Railroad, which evolved into the Chicago, Burlington and Quincy Railroad. The CB&Q operated the commuter service until the railroad merged into the Burlington Northern Railroad in 1970. Burlington Northern merged with the Atchison, Topeka and Santa Fe Railway in 1995 to form the Burlington Northern Santa Fe Railway, which would later rename itself to BNSF Railway.

When the Regional Transportation Authority (RTA) began subsidizing Chicago's commuter rail operations in 1974, Burlington Northern continued to operate its line under contract to the RTA. This arrangement continued when the RTA organized its commuter rail lines under the RTA Commuter Rail Division in 1983, later rebranded as Metra in 1985.

Today, the triple-track line is one of the busiest rail corridors in the United States. In addition to the 91 Metra trains that currently use the line, BNSF freight trains frequent the line at all hours. Rail fans have coined the line as the "BNSF Racetrack".

The  station at South Austin Boulevard and West 29th Street in Cicero was closed on April 1, 2007 due to low ridership and its dilapidation. In the months before its closure, it was used by about 50 passengers a day.

Kendall County extension 
There have been proposals to extend service west into Kendall County, which as of 2020 is outside the RTA's service area. Potential new stations would be built in Montgomery, Oswego, Yorkville, Plano, and Sandwich, Illinois. The Plano station would be located over 1 mile west of the CB&Q Depot currently used by Amtrak's Illinois Zephyr and Carl Sandburg trains.

Ridership
Between 2014 and 2019, annual ridership declined 7% from 16.7 million to 15.5 million passengers. Due to the COVID-19 pandemic, ridership dropped to 3,659,617 passengers in 2020.

Rolling stock

The BNSF Line's locomotive fleet consists of the EMD F40PH-3 and the EMD F40PHM-3. Until 2012, some MPI MP36PH-3S locomotives (401-405) also operated on the line; however, they were reassigned to the Milwaukee lines and the North Central Service due to operating difficulties. Passenger cars include coaches from Pullman (Bike Car), Budd, Morrison-Knudsen/Amerail, and Nippon Sharyo.

Stations

References

External links 

 Metra BNSF Railway Service Schedule
 Thornapple River Rail Series BNSF's Metra Racetrack: A Railroad Superhighway

Chicago, Burlington and Quincy Railroad
Chicago metropolitan area
Metra lines
BNSF Railway